Merulempista is a genus of moths of the family Pyralidae described by Rolf-Ulrich Roesler in 1967.

It is a small genus of eleven described species and subspecies, distributed in the Palearctic realm except Merulempista cyclogramma occurring in the Indomalayan realm and Merulempista oppositalis ranging from the Indomalayan to Australasian realms.

Species
Merulempista cingillella (Zeller, 1846)
Merulempista colorata Mey, 2011
Merulempista cyclogramma (Hampson, 1896) (Oriental Region)
Merulempista digitata Li & Ren, 2011
Merulempista jucundella (Chrétien, 1911)
Merulempista oppositalis (Walker, 1863) (Oriental to Australian regions)
Merulempista ragonoti (Rothschild, 1913)
Merulempista rubriptera Li & Ren, 2011
Merulempista saharae P. Leraut, 2002
Merulempista turturella (Zeller, 1848)
Merulempista wolschrijni Asselbergs, 1997

External links

Phycitini
Pyralidae genera